ILoveMakonnen (stylized as I LOVE MAKONNEN) is the eponymous debut extended play by American recording artist ILoveMakonnen, released on December 15, 2014, originally released as a free EP on July 6, 2014. It features seven songs, like the mixtape, except there are two new songs. It features guest appearances by Drake, Key!, and Father. Its two singles are "Tuesday" and "I Don't Sell Molly No More". In December 2014, the  breakout hit, "Tuesday", was nominated for Best Rap/Sung Collaboration at the 57th Annual Grammy Awards.

Background
ILoveMakonnen was originally released as a free EP from the artist in July 2014. As a result of the success with the remixed version of "Club Goin’ Up on a Tuesday" by Drake, an EP was determined to be re-released in later in the year on December 15, 2014 through OVO Sound. The track list however cuts the original seven songs on the mixtape to mastered versions and two new songs on the purchaseable  EP. A track titled "Swerve" would be the only new song to be released on the EP.

Singles
"Tuesday" was released as the first single seven months prior to the release of the free EP as a digital download from the ILoveMakonnen mixtape. The song was eventually released as an official single on September 1, 2014. The single became Makonnen's most successful song to date, peaking at number twelve on the Billboard Hot 100.

Track listing

References

2014 debut EPs
OVO Sound EPs
Warner Records EPs
Albums produced by Metro Boomin
Albums produced by Mike Will Made It
Albums produced by Sonny Digital
Albums produced by FKi (production team)
Albums produced by TM88
Albums produced by Southside (record producer)